Maria-Einsiedel-Mühlbach (also Mühlbach) is a river of Bavaria, Germany. It is a branch of the Maria-Einsiedel-Bach in Munich.

See also
List of rivers of Bavaria

Rivers of Bavaria
Rivers of Germany

de:Floßkanal (München)#Abzweige